Mtamvuna River is a river that forms the border between KwaZulu-Natal and the Eastern Cape Provinces in South Africa. The river has a wide mouth and flows into the Indian Ocean just south of Port Edward. The Mtamvuna river is approximately 162 km long with a catchment area of 1,553 km². The name means "the reaper of mouthfuls" because of the damage the river does to crops during floods.

History
Historically the Mtamvuna River is the northern limit of the Pondoland region.

In 1552 a Portuguese ship ran aground at the mouth of the Mtamvuna River and a group of local people got close to the sailors wishing to trade with them.

Ecology
The Umtamvuna Nature Reserve is a protected area located close to the deep Mtamvuna River Gorge. Presently this river is part of the Mvoti to Umzimkulu Water Management Area.

See also 
 List of rivers in South Africa
 List of estuaries of South Africa

References

External links

The Mtamvuna River and Adjacent Coastline

KwaZulu-Natal South Coast
Rivers of the Eastern Cape
Rivers of KwaZulu-Natal
Internal borders of South Africa